Oscar Jansson (born 23 December 1990) is a Swedish professional footballer who plays as a goalkeeper for IFK Norrköping.

Career
Jansson was born and raised in Örebro where he played for lower division locals Karlslunds IF HFK before joining Tottenham on 2 January 2007. He was spotted when playing Under-16 European qualifiers for Sweden.

At the beginning of September 2009, he joined Exeter City on a one-month loan deal. He then went on to make his debut away at Gillingham where Exeter lost 3–0. Exeter extended Jansson's loan till the end of October.
Exeter again extended Jansson's loan deal into a third and final month until 1 December 2009. He returned to Tottenham Hotspur on 1 December after completing his three-month loan deal with Exeter City. In August 2010 Jansson joined Northampton Town on a short-term loan, returning to Tottenham on 7 September 2010.

On 8 August 2011, Jansson signed a one-month loan deal with Bradford City. After making one League appearance and two Cup appearances for Bradford, Jansson returned to Spurs on 7 September 2011.

Jansson guested for Shamrock Rovers in a friendly at Glentoran in February 2012, and signed until June 2012. After being released from Tottenham, Jansson signed a permanent contract for Rovers until the end of the season.

On 26 December, it was confirmed that Jansson has signed a three-year contract with Örebro SK.

In the summer of 2020 Jansson announced he would leave Örebro for a bigger challenge, and in January 2021 he signed a three-year contract with Swedish top-flight club IFK Norrköping.

In January 2013 Jansson was called up to the Sweden national football team for the King's Cup

Honours
Leinster Senior Cup:
 Shamrock Rovers – 2012
Shamrock Rovers Young Player of the Year
 Shamrock Rovers – 2012

References

External links
Profile at the official Tottenham Hotspur website.
 

Swedish footballers
1990 births
Living people
Tottenham Hotspur F.C. players
Exeter City F.C. players
Northampton Town F.C. players
Bradford City A.F.C. players
English Football League players
Shamrock Rovers F.C. guest players
Shamrock Rovers F.C. players
League of Ireland players
Örebro SK players
IFK Norrköping players
Swedish expatriate footballers
Sweden under-21 international footballers
Association football goalkeepers
Sweden youth international footballers
Sweden international footballers
Allsvenskan players
Sportspeople from Örebro